Hyman "Hy" Gotkin (August 16, 1922 – April 11, 2004) was an American professional basketball player who played the guard position. He was Jewish, and attended Thomas Jefferson High School in Brooklyn.  He played basketball for St. John's University from 1942–44, as they won the National Invitational Tournament (NIT) championships in 1943 and 1944. He had a four-year professional career, playing in the American Basketball League.

Gotkin died in 2004 at the age of 81. He is a member of the New York City Basketball Hall of Fame and St. John's Athletic Hall of Fame and the Jewish National Hall of Fame

References

1922 births
2004 deaths
All-American college men's basketball players
American Basketball League (1925–1955) players
Guards (basketball)
Jewish men's basketball players
People from Delray Beach, Florida
Sportspeople from Brooklyn
Basketball players from New York City
St. John's Red Storm men's basketball players
Thomas Jefferson High School (Brooklyn) alumni
American men's basketball players